The Sikh Regiment is an infantry regiment of the Indian Army. Sikh regiment is the highest decorated regiment of the Indian Army and in 1979, the 1st battalion was the Commonwealth's most decorated battalion with 245 pre-independence and 82 post-independence gallantry awards, when it was transformed into the 4th battalion, Mechanised Infantry Regiment. The first battalion of the regiment was officially raised just before the partial annexation of the Sikh Empire on 1 August 1846, by the British East India Company. Currently, the Sikh Regimental Centre is located in Ramgarh Cantonment, Jharkhand. The Centre was earlier located in Meerut, Uttar Pradesh.

The modern Sikh Regiment traces its roots directly from the 11th Sikh Regiment of the British Indian Army. When transferred to the Indian Army like its sister regiments, the numeral prefix (in the case of the Sikh Regiment, 11) was removed and extra battalions were raised, transferred or disbanded to meet army needs. With a humble beginning of two battalions, today the fraternity has grown to a regiment of 19 regular infantry and two reserve battalions strong. The 6th battalion takes over as ceremonial battalion of President's palace of India.

History
After the First Anglo-Sikh War (1845-1846), Sikhs who lived in the territory ruled by the Sikh Empire (the Punjab region) began to be recruited into the Bengal Army of the British East India Company. Among the earliest entirely Sikh units of the Bengal Army were the Regiment of Ferozepore (raised in 1846) which later became the 14th King George's Own Ferozepore Sikhs, and the Regiment of Ludhiana (also raised in 1846) which later became the 15th Ludhiana Sikhs. After the Second Anglo-Sikh War (1848-1849) more Punjabis began to be recruited into the Bengal Army, forming regiments such as the 1st Bengal Military Police Battalion, which later became the 45th Rattray's Sikhs. Sikh units generally remained loyal to the British during the Indian Rebellion of 1857, in which many regiments of the Bengal Army (which mainly recruited from Bengal, Bihar and Awadh) mutinied against their British officers. After the rebellion, troops from Bihar and Awadh were recruited less as they had led the mutiny; the centre of recruitment then shifted to the Punjab and the North-West Frontier, resulting in more Sikhs being recruited into the Bengal Army. A number of new Sikh regiments were raised, such as the 36th Sikhs and 35th Sikhs, both raised in 1887. 21 soldiers of the 36th Sikhs fought in the Battle of Saragarhi against 6,000-10,000 Pashtun tribesmen in 1897 during campaigns in the North-West Frontier, in what is considered by some military historians as one of history's greatest last stands. In 1922 the Indian government reformed the British Indian Army by amalgamating single battalion regiments into multi-battalion regiments; this led to the formation of the 11th Sikh Regiment from the 14th King George's Own Ferozepore Sikhs, the 15th Ludhiana Sikhs, the 45th Rattray's Sikhs, the 36th Sikhs, the 47th Sikhs, and the 35th Sikhs. The 11th Sikh Regiment served during World War II and on the partition of India, the regiment was allotted to the newly formed Indian Army, becoming the Sikh Regiment.

As part of the British Indian Army, Sikh regiments fought in numerous wars all over the world, such as the Second Opium War in China, the Second Anglo-Afghan War, many campaigns on the North-West Frontier, the Western Front, Gallipoli and Mesopotamia campaigns of the First World War, the Third Anglo-Afghan War, and the North African, Italian and Burma campaigns of the Second World War, earning many gallantry awards and battle honours in the process.

During the Indo-Pakistani War of 1947-1948, the 1st battalion of the Sikh Regiment was the first unit to be airlifted to Srinagar to aid in the defence of the Kashmir Valley against Pakistani irregular forces. Battalions of the Sikh Regiment also fought in the Sino-Indian War in 1962, the Indo-Pakistani wars of 1965 and 1971, and the Kargil War in 1999.

Recruitment
Sikh regiment is a "single class" regiment. Its soldiers are solely recruited from  Jat Sikhs and its officers are non-Jat Sikhs. They are trained at the Sikh Regimental Centre, currently located in Ramgarh Cantonment, Jharkhand. The war cry of the regiment, taken from Sikh scriptures, is Jo Bole So Nihal, Sat Sri Akal.

Units

 2nd Battalion
 3rd Battalion
 4th Battalion
 5th Battalion
 6th Battalion 
 7th Battalion
 8th Battalion
 10th Battalion
 11th Battalion
 13th Battalion
 14th Battalion
 16th Battalion
 17th Battalion
 18th Battalion
 19th Battalion
 20th Battalion
 21st Battalion
 22nd Battalion
 23rd Battalion
 24th Battalion

Territorial Army (TA) Units- 
 124 Infantry Battalion (TA) (Sikh) located at New Delhi
 152 Infantry Battalion (TA) (Sikh) located at Ludhiana, Punjab
 157 Infantry Battalion (TA) (Sikh) (Home and Hearth) BD Bari, Jammu and Kashmir

Others:
 1st Battalion is now 4th Battalion, Mechanised Infantry Regiment
 9th Battalion was disbanded in 1984

Battle honours and theatre honours

Battle honours 

Pre-Independence

 Lucknow 1857-58, 1 Sikh
 Arrah 1857, 3 Sikh
 Bihar 1857, 3 Sikh
 China 1860-62, 2 Sikh
 Ali Masjid 1878, 1 & 3 Sikh
 Ahmed Khel 1880, 2 Sikh
 Afghanistan 1878-79, 1 Sikh
 Afghanistan 1878-80, 2 & 3 Sikh
 Kandahar 1880, 2 Sikh
 Suakin 1885, 2 Sikh
 Tofrek 1885, 2 Sikh
 Manipur 1891, 4 Sikh
 Chitral 1895, 1 & 2 Sikh
 Samana 1897, 4 Sikh
 Saragarhi/Gulistan 1897, 36 Sikh
 Punjab Frontier 1897, 2, 3, 4 & 35 Sikh (SRC)
 Malakand 1897, 3 & 35 Sikh (SRC)
 Tirah 1897-98, 2 & 4 Sikh
 China 1900, 1 Sikh
 North-West Frontier 1908, 3 Sikh

World War I		

 La Bassée 1914, 2 & 5 Sikh
 St-Julien	1914, 2 & 5 Sikh
 Armentières	1914-15, 5 Sikh
 Auber 1914, 2 & 5 Sikh
 Givens 1914, 4 Sikh
 Tsingtao 1914, 4 & 5 Sikh
 Neuve Chapelle 1914-15, 2, 3 & 5 Sikh
 France and Flanders 1914-15, 2 & 5 Sikh
 Suez Canal 1914-15, 1 Sikh
 Festubert 1915, 2 Sikh
 Tigris 1916, 3 & 5 Sikh
 Pyres 1915, 2 & 4 Sikh
 Sari Bair 1915, 1 Sikh
 Helles 1915, 1 Sikh
 Krishna 1915, 1 Sikh
 Suva 1915, 1 Sikh
 Gallipoli 1915, 1 Sikh
 Egypt 1915, 1 Sikh
 Mesopotamia 1916-18, 1, 3 & 4 Sikh
 Sharon 1918, 2 & 5 Sikh
 Palestine 1918, 5 Sikh
 Baghdad 1916-18, 5 Sikh
 Kut 1917, 1, 3 & 5 Sikh
 Hai 1917, 3 & 4 Sikh
 Megiddo 1918, 5 Sikh
 Persia 1918, 4 Sikh
 Egypt 1918, 2 & 3 Sikh

Inter-War years		
 North-West Frontier 1918-19, 5 Sikh 
 Afghanistan 1919, 2 Sikh
 Palestine 1921, 5 Sikh

Second World War

 Agordat 1940-41, 4 Sikh
 Keren 1941, 4 Sikh
 El Alamein 1940-43, 4 Sikh
 Omars 1941, 4 Sikh
 Kuantan 1941-42, 5 Sikh
 Niyor Kluang 1941-42, 5 Sikh
 Mersa Matruh 1941-42, 2 Sikh
 Kota Bharu 1942, 5 Sikh
 North Arakan 1942-45, 1 Sikh
 Buthidaung 1942-45, 1 Sikh
 Coriano 1943-45, 2 Sikh
 San Marino 1943-45, 2 Sikh
 Poggio San Giovanni 1943-45, 2 Sikh
 Monte Calvo 1943-45, 4 Sikh
 Kangla Tongbi 1944, 1 Sikh
 Gothic Line 1943-45, 4 Sikh
 Nyaung U Bridgehead 1945, 1 Sikh
 Irrawaddy River 1945, 1 Sikh
 Shandatgyi 1945, 1 Sikh
 Kama 1945, 1 Sikh
 Sittang 1945, 1 Sikh

Post-Independence

 Srinagar 1947, 1 Sikh
 Tithwal 1948,	1 Sikh
 Raja Picquet 1965, 2 Sikh
 Burki 1965, 4 Sikh
 Op Hill 1965, 7 Sikh
 Siramani 1971, 4 Sikh
Poonch 1971, 6 Sikh
 Purbat Ali 1971, 10 Sikh
 Tiger Hill 1999, 8 Sikh

Theatre honours 
 Pre-Independence

 North Africa 1940-43, 2 & 4 Sikh
 Abyssinia 1940-41, 4 Sikh
 Iraq 1941, 3 Sikh
 North Africa 1941-42, 3 Sikh
 Malaya 1941-42, 5 Sikh
 Burma 1942-45, 1 Sikh
 Italy 1943-45, 2 & 4 Sikh
 Greece 1944-45, 2 Sikh

Post-Independence

 Jammu & Kashmir 1947-48, 1, 5, 7 & 16 Sikh
 Jammu & Kashmir 1965, 2, 3 & 7 Sikh
 Punjab 1965, 4 Sikh
 Sindh 1971, 10 Sikh
 Punjab 1971, 2 Sikh
 East Pakistan 1971, 4 Sikh
 Jammu & Kashmir 1971, 5 & 6 Sikh
 Kargil 1999, 8 Sikh

Operation Blue Star
About 5000 Sikh soldiers, some belonging to the regiment, mutinied after the storming of the Golden Temple by the Indian Army as part of Operation Blue Star in 1984. The Sikh Regiment's 9th battalion was disbanded after a large number of its troops mutinied.

Gallantry awards

The museum of the Sikh Regimental Centre displays a record of the Sikh Regiment in four halls viz., 
 The Religious/Motivational Hall
 The Hall of Heritage
 The Regimental Glory Hall
 The Peripheral Gallery

In all, the regiment has to its credit 1652 gallantry awards and honours including:
 2 Param Vir Chakras
 8 Maha Vir Chakras
 64 Vir Chakras
 4 Ashoka Chakras
 14 Victoria Crosses
 21 Indian Order of Merits

In addition it has also earned:
 75 battle honours
 38 theatre honours besides five COAS Unit Citations

Indian Order of Merit
21 soldiers of the 36th Sikhs were posthumously awarded the Indian Order of Merit for their actions in the Battle of Saragarhi in 1897:

 Hav. Ishar Singh
 Nk. Lal Singh
 L/Nk. Chanda Singh
 Sep. Sundar Singh
 Sep. Ram Singh
 Sep. Uttar Singh
 Sep. Sahib Singh
 Sep. Hira Singh
 Sep. Daya Singh
 Sep. Jivan Singh
 Sep. Bhola Singh
 Sep. Narayan Singh
 Sep. Gurmukh Singh
 Sep. Jivan Singh
 Sep. Gurmukh Singh
 Sep. Ram Singh
 Sep. Bhagwan Singh
 Sep. Bhagwan Singh
 Sep. Buta Singh
 Sep. Jivan Singh
 Sep. Nand Singh

Victoria Cross

 Nk. Gian Singh, 11th Sikh Regiment (while serving in 15th Punjab Regiment)
 Nk. Nand Singh, 11th Sikh Regiment

Param Vir Chakra
 Lance Naik Karam Singh, 1 Sikh Regiment
 Subedar Joginder Singh, 1 Sikh Regiment

Ashok Chakra
 Subedar Surinder Singh
 Havildar Bachittar Singh
 Havildar Joginder Singh

Maha Vir Chakra
 Major Ajit Singh
 Sub. Ajit Singh
 Sep. Amar Singh
 Brigadier Joginder Singh Bakshi
 Major Amarjit Singh Bal
 Lieutenant Colonel Inderbal Singh Bawa
 Sub. Nand Singh
 Lieutenant Colonel Dewan Ranjit Rai
 Shanghara Singh

Vir Chakra
 Lieutenant General Harbaksh Singh
 Subedar Nirmal Singh (Posthumously)
 Subedar Karnail Singh (Posthumously)
 Sepoy Satpal Singh
 2nd Lieutenant R S Nagar (16 Sikh Regiment)
 L/Nk Mohinder Singh (16 Sikh Regt)

Padma Vibhushan
 Lieutenant General Harbaksh Singh

Padma Bhushan
 Lieutenant General Harbaksh Singh

Padma Shri
 Subedar Kaur Singh (10 Sikh) Boxing

See also
 Baba Harbhajan Singh

Alliances
 - Duke of Lancaster's Regiment

References
NotesCitationsBibliography
 1st King George V's own battalion,: The Sikh Regiment
 A Legacy of Valour - An Illustrated History of the Sikh Regiment (1846-2010). Ramgarh: The Sikh Regiment Officers' Association, 2011, .

External links

globalsecurity.org: The Sikh Regiment
Bharat-Rakshak.com: The Sikh Regiment

1846 establishments in British India
Sikh
Sikh
Military units and formations established in 1846
S